Mary J. Farnham ( Scott; November 22, 1833 – February 22, 1913) was a British-born American missionary and temperance advocate. For 20 years, she served as president of the Woman's Christian Temperance Union (W.C.T.U.) of China. As a missionary to Shanghai, Farnham conducted a free day school for poor girls and a large boarding school.

Early life and education
Mary Jane Scott was born at Newcastle-on-Tyne, England, November 22, 1833. Her parents were Thomas Scott (1807-?) and Catherine (nee Dean) (1809-1832).

She was educated privately. A total abstainer from childhood, she was always interested in temperance work.

In 1854, after both parents died in a single day by a cholera epidemic, Farnham emigrated to the U.S. to live with her sister in New York, locating first in Albany, and afterward in Brooklyn.

Career
On May 4, 1859, she married the Rev. John Marshall Willoughby Farnham (1839-1917) in Schenectady, New York, and in October of that year, sailed with her husband for China, both Mr. and Mrs. Farnham having been engaged as missionaries by the Presbyterian Board of Foreign Missions. For 54 years, they carried on their work. When Mary Greenleaf Clement Leavitt went to Shanghai, Farnham was happy to welcome her to her home, and later to co-operate with Miss Ackerman, and Mrs. Andrew and Dr. Katharine Bushnell in their work in China. 

In 1861, she and her husband founded "The Mary Farnham Girls' School" (now called Shanghai No.8 High School).  

For more than a quarter-century, Farnham was active in temperance work. From 1878 to 1882, she was prominent in the Independent Order of Good Templars, at one time holding the office of Worthy Chief Templar. Later, she interested herself in the W.C.T.U., which was established in China in 1880, becoming president of the W.C.T.U. of China in 1890, and continuing in that office for more than 20 years. She was indefatigable in her efforts to advance the cause of temperance.

Personal life
The Farnham's had seven children: Elizabeth Scott (b. 1861); Mary Hittie (1862-1863); Maggie Scott (1864-1868); Mabelle (b. 1866); Bertha (1868-1870); Katie Thorburn (b. 1870); and Alfred David (1873-1874).

Mary Jane Scott Farnham died in Shanghai, China, February 22, 1913. 

On March 3, 1913, the following appreciative memorial minute was adopted by the Presbyterian Board of Foreign Missions:— 

In 1913, Rev. Farnham published A Devoted Life, a compilation in memory of his wife, containing memorial notices, letters of condolences from missionaries and friends in China, England, the U.S., some verses written by Mrs. Farnham, and her music to "The Radiant Morn Has Passed Away". The frontispiece was adorned with a portrait of Mrs. Farnham.

References

1833 births
1913 deaths
Temperance activists
Woman's Christian Temperance Union people
American Presbyterian missionaries
People from Newcastle upon Tyne
People from Shanghai
Female Christian missionaries
Presbyterian missionaries in China
English emigrants to the United States